Matthew Edward Krook (born October 21, 1994) is an American professional baseball pitcher in the New York Yankees organization. A native of Hillsborough, California, Krook pitched for the Oregon Ducks and was drafted by the Miami Marlins in the first round of the 2013 Major League Baseball draft and the San Francisco Giants in the fourth round of the 2016 Major League Baseball draft.

Early life
Krook attended St. Ignatius College Preparatory in San Francisco, California, where he played for the baseball team. In his senior year, he had a 2–1 win–loss record with a 1.65 earned run average (ERA). He was named a First Team All-American and All-Region by Perfect Game and was named to the All-State team by MaxPreps. He was considered one of the top prep pitchers eligible for the 2013 MLB draft.

College career
Krook enrolled at the University of Oregon to play college baseball with the Oregon Ducks. He was named a Louisville Slugger First-Team Freshman All-American. He pitched to a 2–1 record and a 1.79 ERA, with 60 strikeouts. Among his highlights that year were an 11-strikeout performance against Loyola Marymount and a quality start where he allowed only five hits in seven innings against Hawaii. Krook's season ended unexpectedly after he felt arm stiffness in a game against Washington State. He elected to undergo Tommy John surgery on April 22, with the procedure done by noted orthopedic surgeon Dr. James Andrews.

Krook did not pitch his sophomore season, although he had expressed interest in playing in the 2015 NCAA Tournament and would have agreed to burn his redshirt had the Ducks made it past the Springfield (IL) Regional. He made his debut that summer for the Wareham Gatemen of the Cape Cod League. He pitched to an 0–1 record with a 6.35 ERA and 15 strikeouts in six starts.

Professional career

Drafts and minor leagues
The Miami Marlins selected Krook in the competitive balance round, with the 35th overall pick, of the 2013 draft. Although he had originally intended to sign with the team, and the two sides had agreed upon a contract, he failed a physical examination and the Marlins withdrew their offer.

The San Francisco Giants selected Krook in the fourth round, with the 125th overall selection, of the 2016 Major League Baseball draft. Krook signed with the Giants, was assigned to the AZL Giants, and was later promoted to the Salem-Keizer Volcanoes. He posted a combined 1–4 record with a 5.53 ERA in 13 games (11 starts) between both teams. He spent 2017 with the San Jose Giants where he went 4–9 with a 5.12 ERA in 25 games (17 starts).

On December 20, 2017, the Giants traded Krook, Christian Arroyo, Denard Span, and Stephen Woods to the Tampa Bay Rays for Evan Longoria and cash considerations. Krook spent the 2018 season with the Montgomery Biscuits, pitching to a 4–2 record with a 4.26 ERA in 37 games (six starts). He returned to Montgomery to begin 2019.

On December 10, 2020, the New York Yankees selected Krook from the Rays in the minor league phase of the Rule 5 draft. He began the 2021 season with the Somerset Patriots and was promoted to the Scranton/Wilkes-Barre RailRiders during the season. He started for Scranton/Wilkes-Barre on Opening Day of the 2022 season. Krook had a 10-7 record and a 4.09 ERA for the RailRiders in 2022. His 155 strikeouts set a new franchise record for a season which was previously held by Carlton Loewer since 1997. After the 2022 season, the Yankees added him to their 40-man roster.

See also
Rule 5 draft results

References

External links

1994 births
Living people
People from Hillsborough, California
People from San Mateo, California
Baseball players from California
Baseball pitchers
Oregon Ducks baseball players
Wareham Gatemen players
Arizona League Giants players
Salem-Keizer Volcanoes players
San Jose Giants players
Montgomery Biscuits players
Peoria Javelinas players
Somerset Patriots players
Scranton/Wilkes-Barre RailRiders players